Box 13 is a syndicated radio drama about the escapades of newspaperman-turned-mystery novelist Dan Holiday, played by film star Alan Ladd. Created by Ladd's company, Mayfair Productions, Box 13 aired in different cities over different dates and times. It first aired in several United States radio markets in October 1947.

Synopsis
To seek out new ideas for his fiction, Holiday ran a classified ad in the Star-Times newspaper where he formerly worked: "Adventure wanted, will go anywhere, do anything – write Box 13, Star-Times". The stories followed Holiday's adventures when he responded to the letters sent to him by such people as a psycho killer and various victims.

Cast and Crew

Main Cast 
Alan Ladd as Dan Holiday
Sylvia Picker as Holiday's scatterbrained secretary, Suzy.
Edmund MacDonald as police Lt. Kling, Holiday's foil.

Guest cast members included Betty Lou Gerson, Frank Lovejoy, Lurene Tuttle, Alan Reed, Luis Van Rooten, and John Beal. Vern Carstensen, who directed Box 13 for producer Richard Sanville, was also the show's announcer.

The series featured music by Rudy Schrager. Russell Hughes, who had previously hired Ladd as a radio actor in 1935 at a $19 weekly salary, wrote most of the scripts, sometimes in collaboration with Ladd. The partners in Mayfair Productions were Ladd and Bernie Joslin, who had previously run the chain of Mayfair Restaurants.

Raymond Burr appeared in some episodes.

Adaptations 
At least one attempt to convert the series for television was tried when Ladd appeared in an adaptation of "Daytime Nightmare" (retitled "Committed") on CBS' General Electric Theater (December 5, 1954). Russell Hughes, who was then working at Columbia, reworked the script for the small screen. "We hope it comes off well", said Ladd. "If so, the other 51 scenarios are on the shelf, waiting." The show was produced by Jaguar, Ladd's own company.

The TV show did not result in a series. In 1956, Ladd announced that Jaguar would still attempt to make a series, but Ladd would not star as Holiday. Ladd's wife Sue Carol was reported as being involved in casting.

In 1958, Jaguar hired Charles Bennett to adapt the series into a television series.

In 1959, it was reported Ladd was working on scripts for a TV series with Aaron Spelling. Bill Leslie was to play the lead, opposite Ann McRae.

Shortly before his death, Ladd announced plans to make a feature film version of the show. He said he would play the lead and the movie would feature 13 cameos from stars that Ladd had worked with in the past. Possible names included William Bendix, Veronica Lake, Brian Donlevy, and Macdonald Carey.

Box 13 was also re-imagined (rather than a straight adaptation or continuation) as a comic book series in 2010, by David Gallaher and Steve Ellis, and published by ComiXology. It is published digitally by comiXology and published in print by Red 5 Comics:
http://www.red5comics.com/?p=668

Episodes

References

External links

"Committed" for General Electric Theater at Internet Archive
Internet Archive: Box 13
OTR Net Library – all 52 episodes of Box 13
Zoot Radio, free Box 13 old time radio show downloads, over 50 episodes

American radio dramas
1940s American radio programs
Syndicated radio programs